Ten Royal Navy ships have been named HMS Lynx after the wild cat:

  was a 10-gun sloop launched in 1761 and sold in 1777.
  was a 16-gun sloop launched in 1777. Converted to a hospital ship in 1780, the ship was sold in 1783.
  was a 16-gun sloop launched in 1794 and sold in 1813.
 Lynx was to have been an 18-gun . Originally ordered in 1812 as HMS Pandora she was renamed Lynx. However construction was canceled in 1818.
  was a  launched in 1833 and broken up in 1845.
  was an  wooden screw gunvessel launched in 1854 and sold in 1862.
  was a  launched in 1868 and sold in 1888.
  was a  launched in 1894 and sold in 1912.
  was an  launched in 1913 and sunk by a mine in the Moray Firth in 1915.
  was a Type 41 (or Leopard-class) frigate launched in 1955, sold to Bangladesh in 1982 and renamed Abu Bakr.
  was also a shore establishment at Dover commissioned in 1939 and paid off in 1946.

References

Royal Navy ship names